Luigi Poggi (1917–2010) was an Italian cardinal.

Luigi Poggi may also refer to:

 Luigi Poggi (sailor) (1906–1972), Italian sailor

See also
 Louis Poggi (footballer), French footballer